"Believers" is the tenth episode of the first season of the science fiction television series, Babylon 5. It first aired on April 27, 1994. It follows Dr. Franklin's ethical dilemma after he encounters a dying boy whose parents refuse to allow him to receive treatment that will save him, and Commander Susan Ivanova's mission to rescue a stranded transport ship in Raider territory.

Plot
Dr. Franklin faces an ethical dilemma when the parents of Shon, a dying alien child refuse to let him operate for religious reasons. Their son is suffering from an eventually fatal respiratory ailment. Franklin is confident he can save Shon, with surgery, but the family's alien religion prohibits surgery, believing that cutting into a body will release the spirit, reducing the body to something worse than death. They mention it as something only done to food animals in their culture. Franklin's associate Dr. Hernandez attacks their beliefs, but Franklin reprimands her, telling her that they have to work with the parents, not against them.

Dr. Franklin goes to Commander Sinclair and attempts to use a previous command order he gave as basis for an immediate operation on Kosh, the Vorlon ambassador, by the station's previous doctor. Sinclair acknowledges he must consider the request but needs time. During this, Shon's parents attempt to sway the other alien race ambassadors to intervene on their behalf, but none of them accept this. Even Sinclair finds that Earth does not want a part in this decision. Sinclair goes to talk to Shon to make his determination. Sinclair eventually tells Franklin that he will refuse to let him operate as to maintain the cultural neutrality of the station. With Shon near death, his parents spend more time with him before they depart; as soon as they leave, Franklin decides to operate against orders. The operation is a success, and Franklin proves to Shon that his spirit has not changed, but when Shon's parents arrive, they treat him as an soulless demon and abandon him. They eventually return for him saying that they have brought his "travel robe" and are going to take him "to rest." After they leave Franklin checks Hernandez's notes on the species in the medical database and realizes that the boy was wearing a robe used in spiritual journeys, not physical ones. He runs to the family's quarters fearing the implication that "journey" in this case provides, but it is too late. The parents have already ritually slain the boy. Later, Sinclair informally reprimands Franklin, but points out that Shon's fate would not have changed regardless of what Franklin did, and he should not feel upset over the outcome.

In a subplot, a restless Commander Susan Ivanova gets Sinclair to allow her to lead a squadron of fighters into Raider territory in order to rescue a stranded transport ship, the Asimov. She eventually ends up going against orders and following an enemy scout. This results in her discovering a fleet of Raiders waiting in ambush. She stops the ambush, thus saving the families aboard the transport.

Production, Visual and Sound Effects 
The role of Shon's mother M'ola, was played by Tricia O'Neil who is particularly known for playing investigative, police and science fiction roles. She played the Earth Alliance President in the TV movie Babylon 5: In the Beginning.  She played a number of roles in the Star Trek franchise, including Captain Rachel Garrett, captain of USS Enterprise NCC-1701-C in the Star Trek: The Next Generation episode, Yesterday's Enterprise.

Actor and acting coach Silvana Gallardo played the character of Dr Maya Hernandez.  Gallardo created the Gallardo Method for acting, and played alongside Charles Bronson in Death Wish II, playing a rape victim.

Babylon 5 intentionally cast a large number of non-white actors in various roles.  Series creator J Michael Straczynski wrote, "It's been my belief, and I'll say it again, that if we go to the stars at all, we're ALL going…"

The Babylon 5 makeup department involved in this episode – consisting of Everett Burrell, Greg Funk, Mary Kay Morse, Ron Pipes and John Vulich – won the 1994 Emmy Award for Outstanding Individual Achievement in Makeup for a Series for episode 5 of the season, 'The Parliament of Dreams'

For its visual effects scenes, Babylon 5 pioneered the use of computer-generated imagery (CGI) scenes – instead of using more expensive physical models – in a television series.

Den of Geek
Jules-Pierre Malartre, writing in the science fiction review site, Den of Geek, describes Richard Biggs' performance as Dr Stephen Franklin as "brilliant" and "emotionally charged", in a powerful episode which deals with a timeless issue: scientific advancement vs religion.  Malartre notes that it is not a matter of right versus wrong, but rather the pros and cons of "a religion that has survived faster-than-light travel clashing against the social values of a multicultural, advanced community[…] and the personal beliefs of a medical doctor with the power of life over death."

He concludes, "As much as some people have been saying that the first season was a mess, early first season episodes [like] 'Believers', 'Deathwalker' and 'Mind War' were already setting the tone for a very mature, thought-provoking sci-fi show."

See also
Jehovah's Witnesses and blood transfusions, an inspiration for the episode's plot

References

External links

 Steve Burg's concept art for the Starfury fighter, along with Burg's unused concept art of the walking machine designed for Terminator 2.

Babylon 5 episodes
1994 American television episodes